The 2019 Tre Valli Varesine was the 99th edition of the Tre Valli Varesine road cycling one day race. It was held on 8 October 2019 as part of the 2019 UCI Europe Tour in category 1.HC, over a distance of 197.8 km, starting in Saronno and ending in Varese.

Teams
Twenty-two teams were invited to take part in the race. These included fourteen UCI WorldTeams and eight UCI Professional Continental teams.

Results

References 

Tre Valli Varesine
Tre Valli Varesine
Tre Valli Varesine